The Empty Star is a 1960 Mexican drama film directed by Emilio Gómez Muriel starring María Félix and inspired by the novel of the same name by Luis Spota.

Plot
Olga Lang (María Félix) is a young girl who dreams of stardom. Olga sacrifices everything for her career, even ending an inconvenient pregnancy after a love affair. When she is a massive star she realizes her life is unhappy and emotionally empty.

Cast
 María Félix - Olga Lang
 Ignacio López Tarso - Luis Arvide
 Enrique Rambal - Rodrigo Lemus
 Tito Junco - Edmundo Sisler
 Ramón Gay - Raul
 Carlos Navarro - Rolando Vidal
 Rita Macedo - Teresa Mayen
 Wof Rubinskis - Tomas Tellez
 Carlos López Moctezuma
 Mauricio Garcés

References

External links

1960 drama films
1960 films
Mexican black-and-white films
1960s Mexican films